A Pythian Castle was a local meeting place of the Knights of Pythias. It may refer to one of the following (listed alphabetically by U.S. state):

 Pythian Castle (Arcata, California)
 Pythian Home of Missouri, Springfield, Missouri, also known as Pythian Castle
 Pythian Castle (Toledo, Ohio)
 Knights of Pythias Building (Fort Worth, Texas), also known as Pythian Castle Hall
 Pythian Castle (Portsmouth, Virginia)
 Pythian Castle Lodge, Milwaukee, Wisconsin

See also
List of Knights of Pythias buildings
 Pythian Temple (disambiguation)